Dorota Świeniewicz (born 27 July 1972) is a Polish volleyball player, a member of Poland women's national volleyball team in 1991–2009, double European Champion (2003, 2005), Polish Champion (1996, 2010), Italian Champion (2003, 2005).

Personal life
On March 1, 2007 she gave birth to son named Julian. Child's father is Marek Brandt - a former manager of Poland women's national volleyball team.

Career

National team
On September 28, 2003 Poland women's national volleyball team, including Świeniewicz, beat Turkey (3–0) in final and won title of European Champion 2003. Two years later, Polish team with Świeniewicz in squad defended title and achieved second title of European Champion. She was Most Valuable Player of tournament.

Sporting achievements

Clubs

CEV Champions League
  2003/2004 - with Pallavolo Sirio Perugia
  2005/2006 - with Pallavolo Sirio Perugia

CEV Cup
  2004/2005 - with Pallavolo Sirio Perugia

National championships
 1993/1994  Polish Championship, with BKS Stal Bielsko-Biała
 1994/1995  Polish Championship, with BKS Stal Bielsko-Biała
 1995/1996  Polish Championship, with BKS Stal Bielsko-Biała
 1996/1997  Polish Championship, with BKS Stal Bielsko-Biała
 1998/1999  Italian Cup, with Pallavolo Sirio Perugia
 2002/2003  Italian Cup, with Pallavolo Sirio Perugia
 2002/2003  Italian Championship, with Pallavolo Sirio Perugia
 2004/2005  Italian Cup, with Pallavolo Sirio Perugia
 2004/2005  Italian Championship, with Pallavolo Sirio Perugia
 2007/2008  Spanish Championship, with Ícaro Palma
 2009/2010  Polish Championship, with BKS Stal Bielsko-Biała
 2010/2011  Polish Championship, with Atom Trefl Sopot

National team
 2003  CEV European Championship
 2005  CEV European Championship

Individually
 2005 CEV European Championship - Most Valuable Player

State awards
 2005  Knight's Cross of Polonia Restituta

References

External links
 ORLENLiga player profile
 ORLENLiga coach profile

1972 births
Living people
People from Wałbrzych County
Sportspeople from Lower Silesian Voivodeship
Polish women's volleyball players
Polish expatriates in Italy
Expatriate volleyball players in Italy
Polish expatriates in Spain
Expatriate volleyball players in Spain
Knights of the Order of Polonia Restituta